The 2013–14 Saint Mary's Gaels women's basketball team represented Saint Mary's College of California in the 2013–14 college basketball season. It was head coach Paul Thomas's eighth season at Saint Mary's. The Gaels, members of the West Coast Conference, played their home games at the McKeon Pavilion. They would finish the season 23–10, tying for fourth in the conference and making the WNIT.

Before the season
A few coaching changes took place for the Gaels. Associate Head Coach Jesse Clark departed Saint Mary's to join San Diego State. To fill the vacancy, Tracy Sanders was moved from Assistant Coach to Associated Head Coach. To fill her vacancy, Lisa O'Meara was hired as a new assistant coach, moving up from being the Director of Basketball Operations at Saint Mary's.

Roster

Schedule and results
Source:

|-
!colspan=12 style="background:#06315B; color:#D80024;"| Regular Season

|-
!colspan=12 style="background:#D80024; color:#06315B;"| 2014 West Coast Conference women's basketball tournament

|-
!colspan=12 style="background:#D80024; color:#06315B;"| 2014 Women's National Invitation Tournament

Game Summaries

Washington

Portland State

Butler

UC Santa Barbara

Cal Poly

Alabama

Toledo

Sacramento State

UC Davis

USC

Cal State Northridge

Gonzaga
Series History: Gonzaga leads 33-24

Portland
Series History: Saint Mary's leads 36-20

San Diego
Series History: Saint Mary's leads 37-26

BYU
Series History: Saint Mary's leads 3-2
Broadcasters: Spencer Linton, Kristen Kozlowski, and Andy Boyce

Santa Clara
Series History: Santa Clara leads 33-31

San Francisco
Series History: Saint Mary's leads 34-23

Pepperdine
Series History: Saint Mary's leads 31-29

Loyola Marymount
Series History: Saint Mary's leads 39-16

Pacific
Series History: Saint Mary's leads 13-6
Broadcasters: Don Gubbins and Alex Sanchez

BYU
Series History: Series even 3-3
Broadcasters: George Devine and Mary Hile-Nepfel

San Diego
Series History: Saint Mary's leads 37-27

Pacific
Series History: Saint Mary's leads 13-7
Broadcasters: George Devine and Mary Hile-Nepfel

Loyola Marymount
Series History: Saint Mary's leads 40-16

Pepperdine
Series History: Saint Mary's leads 32-29
Broadcaster: Josh Perigo

San Francisco
Series History: Saint Mary's leads 35-23

Santa Clara
Series History: Santa Clara leads 33-32

Gonzaga
Series History: Gonzaga leads 33-25
Broadcasters: Greg Heister and Stephanie Hawk Freeman

Rankings

See also
Saint Mary's Gaels women's basketball
2013–14 Saint Mary's Gaels men's basketball team

References

Saint Mary's Gaels women's basketball seasons
Saint Mary's
2014 Women's National Invitation Tournament participants
Saint
Saint